Mona Breckmann (born 6 September 1991) is a Faroese former footballer who played as a forward. She has been a member of the Faroe Islands women's national team.

References

1991 births
Living people
Women's association football forwards
Faroese women's footballers
People from Tórshavn
Faroe Islands women's international footballers